Giulio Vincenzo Gentile, O.P.  (1620–1694) was a Roman Catholic prelate who served as Archbishop of Genoa (1681–1694).

Biography
Giulio Vincenzo Gentile was born in Genoa, Italy in 1620 and ordained a priest in the Order of Preachers.
On 17 March 1681, he was appointed during the papacy of Pope Innocent XI as Archbishop of Genoa.
On 23 March 1681, he was consecrated bishop by Giacomo Franzoni, Bishop of Camerino, with Niccolò Radulovich, Archbishop of Chieti, and Giacomo de Angelis, Archbishop Emeritus of Urbino, serving as co-consecrators.
He served as Archbishop of Genoa until his death in June 1694.

References

External links and additional sources
 (for Chronology of Bishops) 
 (for Chronology of Bishops) 

17th-century Italian Roman Catholic archbishops
Bishops appointed by Pope Innocent XI
1620 births
1694 deaths
Dominican bishops
17th-century Roman Catholic bishops in Genoa